The Replacement Army was part of the Imperial German Army during World War I and part of the Wehrmacht during World War II. It was based within Germany proper and included command and administrative units as well as training and guard troops. Its primary role was to provide replacements for the combat divisions of the regular army.

Third Reich
It was formed in the various German military districts (Wehrkreise) and was tasked with the conscription, recruitment, training and replacement of personnel, testing of new military equipment, and administration such as responsibility for soldiers on home leave.

The Ersatzheer contingency plans for Operation Valkyrie were deliberately misused as part of the unsuccessful 20 July plot to assassinate Adolf Hitler, arrest SS troops, and stage a military coup d'etat through the organization driven by the newly appointed Chief of Staff, Claus von Stauffenberg, in early 1944. Its commander, Generaloberst Friedrich Fromm, had enough power to control the German state because his position controlled the army's procurement and production and the command of all army troops in Germany. Fromm had refused to cooperate in an earlier coup, Operation Spark, but the planners in 1944 still planned to use the Replacement Army. Heinrich Himmler personally took over control of the Replacement Army because of its potential to be used in another assassination attempt.

Leadership
Commanders

Chief of Staff

References

External links

Military units and formations of the Wehrmacht
Military units and formations of Germany in World War I